Jamie C. "J. C." France (born November 1, 1965) is a former American auto racing driver. He last competed in the Grand-Am Rolex Sports Car Series with the No. 59 Brumos Porsche-Riley Daytona Prototype with João Barbosa. He is the son of Jim France, nephew of Bill France Jr. and grandson of NASCAR's founder Bill France, Sr.  He was involved in a fistfight with rival Chris Bingham after the two collided at the 2006 race at the Autodromo Hermanos Rodriguez in Mexico City.

Images

References

External links
 

1965 births
24 Hours of Daytona drivers
Rolex Sports Car Series drivers
Living people
Sportspeople from Lakeland, Florida
Racing drivers from Florida
France family
Action Express Racing drivers